"The Fear" is the penultimate episode of the American television series The Twilight Zone. It is the last episode written by series creator/host Rod Serling.

Opening narration

Plot
Highway Patrol trooper Robert Franklin is dispatched to the remote mountain cabin of brooding New York City fashion magazine editor Charlotte Scott (recuperating from a nervous breakdown), as unexplained occurrences indicate the presence of a mysterious force.  Bright flashes of light are seen, strange craters appear, and the trooper's car is turned on its side, breaking the radio.  Back inside, they find the phone dead.  Charlotte hears strange noises on the roof; when Robert goes outside to investigate, he finds that his car is back in place—covered in gigantic fingerprints.

The two sleep nervously, and go out into the woods the next morning, seeking the giant monster.  They find an enormous footprint, leading the socialite to run away, although the nearest village is 30 miles away.  She soon stumbles and falls directly into the path of a 500-foot-tall alien with one eye.  Realizing that no one will believe their story, the pair are left to stand against the beast.  The alien doesn't attack or move, so Robert approaches and shoots it...and it deflates, revealing itself to be an enormous balloon.  The true source of the problem is a small alien spacecraft, containing two aliens no bigger than a man's thumb.  They reveal that all of their trickery has been foiled by "Earth men's failure to be frightened", beg their superiors to allow them to depart (or, in their eyes, face being crushed), and finally flee.  Robert grins and wishes them luck:  "Maybe the next place they land, they can be the giants." Charlotte asks what will happen if future invaders are giants; Robert informs her that "I think you'd spit in their eye."  She smiles and the camera tilts to the skyline as Serling's voiceover begins.

Closing narration

References
DeVoe, Bill. (2008). Trivia from The Twilight Zone. Albany, GA: Bear Manor Media. 
Grams, Martin. (2008). The Twilight Zone: Unlocking the Door to a Television Classic. Churchville, MD: OTR Publishing.

External links

1964 American television episodes
The Twilight Zone (1959 TV series season 5) episodes
Television episodes about alien visitations
Television episodes written by Rod Serling
Television episodes directed by Ted Post